The 2016 Meiji Yasuda J2 League (2016 明治安田生命J2リーグ) season is the 45th season of second-tier club football in Japan and the 18th season since the establishment of J2 League.

Clubs

Omiya Ardija have stayed in the second division for just a year, winning promotion as the champions. Júbilo Iwata have spent only 2 seasons in J2 after their first relegation from the J1 League in 2013 after 20 seasons. Third-placed Avispa Fukuoka won the promotion playoffs and will return to the first division after playing in the J2 for four years. Matsumoto Yamaga were relegated from the J1 immediately after their inaugural promotion. Shimizu S-Pulse also suffered their first relegation to the J2 after 23 seasons in the J1, while Montedio Yamagata returned after one season.

On the other end of the table, Renofa Yamaguchi have been promoted from the 2015 J3 League as the champions of the second season of the J3 League, replacing Tochigi SC and becoming the first club based in Yamaguchi Prefecture to play in the second tier since Eidai SC back in 1973. J3 runners-up Machida Zelvia were also promoted by beating Oita Trinita in the promotion-relegation playoffs.

The participating clubs are listed in the following table:

Managerial changes

Foreign players

League table

Play-offs

J1 Promotion Playoffs
2016 J.League Road To J1 Play-Offs (2016 J1昇格プレーオフ)

Semifinals

Final

Cerezo Osaka was promoted to J1 League.

J3 Relegation Playoffs
2016 J2/J3 Play-Offs (2016 J2・J3入れ替え戦)

Zweigen Kanazawa remains in J2 League.Tochigi SC remains in J3 League.

Positions by round

Last updated: 20 November 2016Source: J. League Data Site
Note 1: Two games for Matchday 8 (V. Varen Nagasaki vs. Mito HollyHock; Kyoto Sanga FC vs. Roasso Kumamoto) scheduled on 17 April 2016 were affected by the series of earthquakes in Kumamoto prefecture.
 Matchday 8 game between Kyoto Sanga FC and Roasso Kumamoto was rescheduled on 29 June 2016. Result of this match were included on Matchday 21 ranking.
 Matchday 8 game between V. Varen Nagasaki and Mito HollyHock was rescheduled on 7 September 2016. Result of this match were included on Matchday 31 ranking.
Note 2: Matchday 8 schedule for Zweigen Kanazawa vs. Ehime FC, scheduled on 17 April 2016, was postponed due to severe storms in the area. The match was rescheduled on May 18 and results were included on Matchday 14 Ranking. 
Note 3: Fixtures of Roasso Kumamoto for Matchdays 9 (Roasso Kumamoto vs. Yokohama FC), 10 (Montedio Yamagata vs. Roasso Kumamoto), 11 (Roasso Kumamoto vs. Ehime FC) and 12 (Consadole Sapporo vs. Roasso Kumamoto) were postponed by the J. League due to series of earthquakes in Kumamoto prefecture.
 Matchday 9 game between Roasso Kumamoto and Yokohama FC was rescheduled on 7 September 2016. Result of this match were included on Matchday 31 ranking.
 Matchday 10 game between Montedio Yamagata and Roasso Kumamoto was rescheduled on 6 July 2016. Result of this match were included on Matchday 22 ranking.
 Matchday 11 game between Roasso Kumamoto and Ehime FC was rescheduled on 31 August 2016. Result of this match were included on Matchday 31 ranking.
 Matchday 12 game between Consadole Sapporo and Roasso Kumamoto was rescheduled on 25 August 2016. Result of this match were included on Matchday 31 ranking.

Results

Top scorers

Updated to games played on 20 November 2016Source: J.League Data

Attendances

References

J2 League seasons
2
Japan
Japan